April 18 - Eastern Orthodox liturgical calendar - April 20

All fixed commemorations below are observed on May 2 by Eastern Orthodox Churches on the Old Calendar.

For April 19th, Orthodox Churches on the Old Calendar commemorate the Saints listed on April 6.

Saints

 Martyrs Theodore of Perge in Pamphylia, his mother Philippa, and Dioscorus, Socrates, and Dionysius (c. 138-161) 
 Hieromartyr Paphnutius of Jerusalem and 546 companions martyred with him (284-305)  (see also: September 25)
 Martyrs Hermogenes, Caius, Expeditus, Aristonicus, Rufus and Galatas, at Melitine, in Armenia.
 Martyrs Christopher, Theonas, and Antoninus, at Nicomedia (303)  (see also: April 20)
 Saint George the Confessor, Bishop of Antioch in Pisidia, Confessor of the Faith (c. 741-775)
 Venerable John of the Ancient Caves in Palestine (8th century)  (see also: April 20)
 Saint Tryphon of Constantinople, Patriarch of Constantinople (931)
 St. Nicephorus, Abbot of Katabad.

Pre-Schism Western saints

 Saint Vincent of Collioure, a martyr in Collioure in Languedoc in the south of France, under Diocletian (c. 304)
 Saint Crescentius, confessor, a subdeacon in Florence in Italy and a disciple of St Zenobius and St Ambrose (c. 396)
 Saint Ursmar, missionary bishop, founder of Aulne Abbey and Wallers Abbey (713)
 Saint Gerold, hermit at a village near Mitternach (978)
 Hieromartyr Alphege of Canterbury, Archbishop of Canterbury (1012)

Post-Schism Orthodox saints

 Venerable Symeon the Barefoot, of Philotheou Monastery, Mount Athos (1594)
 Venerable Joasaph (Bolotov) of Kodiak, Enlightener of Alaska and the American land (1799)
 New Monk-martyr Agathangelus of Esphigmenou Monastery, Mt. Athos, at Smyrna (1819)
 Saint Matrona the Blind, of Moscow (1952)
 Venerable Sebastian the Confessor of Optina and Karaganda (Elder Sebastian of Optina), Wonderworker and Clairvoyant, last of the great Optina Elders (1966) (see also: April 6)

New martyrs and confessors

 New Hiero-confessor Victor (Ostrovidov), Bishop of Glazov (1934)
 New Hieromartyr Demetrius Vlasenkov, Priest of Alma-Ata (1942)

Other commemorations

 Translation of the relics of Saint Moses the Wonderworker, Archbishop of Novgorod (1362)
 Uncovering of the relics (1621) of St. Joachim, founder of Opochka Monastery in Pskov (c. 1550)
 Repose of Fool-for-Christ Asenetha of Goritsy (1892)
 Repose of Hieroschemamonk and Schema-Metropolitan Alexis of Valaam (1900)

Icon gallery

Notes

References

Sources
 April 19 / May 2. Orthodox Calendar (pravoslavie.ru).
 May 2 / April 19. Holy Trinity Russian Orthodox Church (A parish of the Patriarchate of Moscow).
 April 19. OCA - The Lives of the Saints.
 The Autonomous Orthodox Metropolia of Western Europe and the Americas. St. Hilarion Calendar of Saints for the year of our Lord 2004. St. Hilarion Press (Austin, TX). p. 30.
 April 19. Latin Saints of the Orthodox Patriarchate of Rome.
 The Roman Martyrology. Transl. by the Archbishop of Baltimore. Last Edition, According to the Copy Printed at Rome in 1914. Revised Edition, with the Imprimatur of His Eminence Cardinal Gibbons. Baltimore: John Murphy Company, 1916. p. 110.
 Rev. Richard Stanton. A Menology of England and Wales, or, Brief Memorials of the Ancient British and English Saints Arranged According to the Calendar, Together with the Martyrs of the 16th and 17th Centuries. London: Burns & Oates, 1892. pp. 164–168.
Greek Sources
 Great Synaxaristes:  19 Απριλίου. Μεγασ Συναξαριστησ.
  Συναξαριστής. 19 Απριλίου. ecclesia.gr. (H Εκκλησια Τησ Ελλαδοσ). 
Russian Sources
  2 мая (19 апреля). Православная Энциклопедия под редакцией Патриарха Московского и всея Руси Кирилла (электронная версия). (Orthodox Encyclopedia - Pravenc.ru).
  19 апреля (ст.ст.) 2 мая 2013 (нов. ст.) . Русская Православная Церковь Отдел внешних церковных связей.

April in the Eastern Orthodox calendar